The Eden Thirkfield Home is a historic Greek Revival mansion in downtown Franklin, Ohio. It was said to have been built in 1848 for a riverboat captain, Henry C. Storms. He sold the house to Eden B. Thirkfield, a prominent merchant in the town, who willed it to his two children. Eden's son, Wilbur P. Thirkield, lived in the home following his father's death.

References 

Houses in Warren County, Ohio